Utnoor is a census town in Adilabad district of the Indian state of Telangana. It is known for the neolithic excavations.

References 

Census towns in Adilabad district